Pterolophia loochooana is a species of beetle in the family Cerambycidae. It was described by Masaki Matsushita in 1953.

References

loochooana
Beetles described in 1953